This is a list of members of the Flemish Parliament in the 2004–2009 legislature.

The government majority was formed by a coalition of CD&V/N-VA, sp.a-Spirit and VLD-Vivant. Vlaams Blok and Groen! were thus the opposition parties, along with one French-speaking representative.

Election results

By party

SP.A (22)

GROEN! (6)

N-VA (5)

UF (1)

Defunct party: SPIRIT → VL.PRO → SLP

Changes during the legislature

Representatives who resigned

Representatives who changed parties

References

Politics of Flanders
2000s in Belgium